Sir David Emmanuel Jack  (16 July 1918 – 18 July 1998) was Governor-General of Saint Vincent and the Grenadines from 1989 to 1996. He was born in Victoria Village, St Vincent and the Grenadines. He also served as Health Minister from 1986 to 1989, and also as Minister of Labour.

References

1918 births
1998 deaths
Knights Grand Cross of the Order of St Michael and St George
Members of the Order of the British Empire
Governors-General of Saint Vincent and the Grenadines
Government ministers of Saint Vincent and the Grenadines